The 2021 TCCB Open was a professional women's tennis tournament played on outdoor clay courts. It was the first edition of the tournament which was part of the 2021 ITF Women's World Tennis Tour. It took place in Collonge-Bellerive, Switzerland between 30 August and 5 September 2021.

Singles main-draw entrants

Seeds

 1 Rankings are as of 23 August 2021.

Other entrants
The following players received wildcards into the singles main draw:
  Alina Granwehr
  Valentina Ryser
  Sebastianna Scilipoti
  Joanne Züger

The following players received entry from the qualifying draw:
  Sowjanya Bavisetti
  Estelle Cascino
  Jenny Dürst
  Alena Fomina-Klotz
  Nagi Hanatani
  Malene Helgø
  Sandy Marti
  Céline Naef

The following player received entry as a lucky loser:
  İpek Öz

Champions

Singles

 Beatriz Haddad Maia def.  İpek Öz, 5–7, 6–1, 6–4

Doubles

  Amina Anshba /  Anastasia Gasanova def.  Amandine Hesse /  Tatjana Maria, 6–1, 6–7(6–8), [10–8]

References

External links
 2021 TCCB Open at ITFtennis.com
 Official website

2021 ITF Women's World Tennis Tour
2021 in Swiss tennis
August 2021 sports events in Switzerland
September 2021 sports events in Switzerland